Expansion: The History of the Galaxy (Istoriya Galaktiki) is a science fiction book series by Russian writer Andrey Livadny with a plot spanning from the 23rd to the 39th centuries, it embraces several novels, tales, and stories, some of which are within the five collected stories.

Several basic plot lines have the most impact on the series. These include devastating interstellar wars, contacts with alien races, and the collapse and rebirth of civilizations. All of these are intertwined to bring the galaxy to life.

Morality is also central to many of the novels, especially those concerning artificial intelligence.

List of novels 
NOTE: The novels are listed in the chronological order of the story, not the publishing dates.

External links 
  Official site
  MMORPG being created based on the storylines of the novels.
 Deep Space Shadow – Series of online RPGs loosely based on the novels (Russian).
 Spheroid Base – Fan-created encyclopedia (Russian).

Military science fiction novels
Russian science fiction novels
Science fiction book series